Togo Mizrahi (June 2, 1901 – June 5, 1986) was an Egyptian director, actor, producer, and screenwriter. Mizrahi was a prolific filmmaker best known for making popular comedies and musicals. Between 1930 and 1946, he directed 30 Arabic-speaking films and four Greek speaking films, and he produced several  films directed by other filmmakers.

Early life
Joseph Elie Mizrahi was born in Alexandria, Egypt to a Jewish family with Italian nationality. As a child he adopted the nickname, Togo, after Admiral Togo, commemorating Japan's victory over Russia in the Russo-Japanese War.

Career
In 1929 Mizrahi established a studio in Alexandria, Egypt, and founded a production company, The Egyptian Films Company. He produced films in Alexandria until 1939, when he moved to Cairo. Over the course of his career, Mizrahi worked with many popular actors and musicians. He made a number of comedies starring Chalom (Leon Angel), Ali al-Kassar, and Fawzi al-Jazayirli. He directed five films starring singer Leila Mourad. His film, Sallama(1945), starring the Egyptian diva, Umm Kulthum, is thought to be her best performance on screen. He also worked with Youssef Wahbi, Amina Rizk, and Anwar Wagdi. Mizrahi directed actors Taheyya Kariokka and Ismail Yassine in their screen debuts.

In 1946, Mizrahi was accused of Zionist collaboration. Although he seemed poised for a comeback in 1949, Mizrahi never made another movie. In 1952, he appointed his brother Alfred Mizrahi to oversee daily operations of the Egyptian Films Company. Mizrahi left Egypt and settled in Rome, where he died on June 5, 1986.

Filmography

Arabic-language films

 1930: Cocaine or The Abyss  (el kokaïn) (el Hâwya)
 1932: 5001 (khamsat  âlaf wa wâhid)
 1933: Sons of Egypt (Awlâd Misr)
 1934: The Two Delegates (el  Mandoubân)
 1935: Doctor Farahat (el Doktor Farhât)
 1935: Shalom the Interpreter (Shalom el tourgmân)
 1935: The Sailor (el bahhâr)
 1936: A Hundred Thousand Pounds (Mit alf guinih)
 1936: The Guard of the Barracks (Khafir el darak)
 1937: Too Much Money is a Nuisance (el ‘Izz bahdalah)
 1937: Shalom the Athlete (Shalom el riyâdî)
 1937: Seven o'clock (el Sâ‘ah Sab‘ah)
 1938: The Telegram (el Telegraf)
 1938: This is my nature! (Anâ tab ī Kidah)
 1939: Osman and Ali (‘Othman wa ‘Ali)
 1939:  Lend me Three Pounds (Sallifnî talâtah guinîh)
 1939:  A Rainy Night (Laylah moumtirah)
 1940: The Chief Contractor (el Bâchmouqâwil)
 1940: The Heart of a Woman (Qalb imira’ah) 
 1941: The Three Musketeers (el Foursân el thalâthah)
 1941:  Laila from the Countryside (Layla bint el rif)
 1941:  One Thousand and One Nights (Alf Lailah wa Lailah)
 1941:  Laila the School Girl (Layla bint el madâris)
 1942: Laila (Layla)
 1942: Ali Baba and the Forty Thieves (‘Ali Bâbâ wa-l-arba'in harâmi)
 1943: The Right Path (el Tariq el moustaqîm)
 1943: Long live Women!  (Tahyâ el sittât)
 1944: Laila in the Dark (Layla fi-l-zalâm)
 1944: Lies, Lies! (Kidb fi kidb)
 1944: Nour Eddine and the Three Sailors (Nour Eddine wa-l-bahhârah el thalâthah)
 1945:  Sallama (Sallâmah)
 1945: Long live Men! (Tahyâal-riggâlah)

Greek-language films
 1937: Δκρ· Επαμινόνδας Doctor Epaminondas (Doktor Epaminondes)
 1938: Προσφυγοπούλα The Girl Refugee (Prosfigopoula)
 1938: Όταν ο σήζυγος ταξιδυει When the Husband is Absent (Otan o syzygos taxidevi)
 1943: Καπετάνιος Σκορπιός Captain Scorpion (Kapetan Skorpios)

Producer
 1944: The Son of the Blacksmith (Ibn el haddâd)
 1944: Mohamed Ali Street (Shâri’ Mouhammad ‘Ali)
 1945: Appearances (el Mazâhir)
 1945: The Great Artist (el Fannân el 'azîm)
 1945: Love Story (Qissat gharâm)
 1946: Divine Providence (Yadu Allah)
 1946: Love Train (Express el houbb)
 1946: Beauty Queen (Malikat el gamâl)

References

Further reading
 Deborah A. Starr: Togo Mizrahi and the making of Egyptian cinema, Oakland, California : University of California Press, [2020],

External links

Togo Mizrahi on Alex Cinema.
Media related to Togo Mizrahi.
Elcinema.com
Starr, Deborah. Togo Mizrahi and the Making of Egyptian Cinema, University of California Press, open access, 2020.

1901 births
1986 deaths
Egyptian Jews
Egyptian male film actors
Egyptian screenwriters
Egyptian film directors
People from Alexandria
20th-century Egyptian male actors
20th-century screenwriters